The 2023 RAN Women's Rugby Championship will see the return of women's fifteen-a-side rugby to the region. The tournament is expected to be held from July 12 to 16 in Kingston, Jamaica, at the University of the West Indies.

References 

Women's rugby union competitions for national teams
Rugby union competitions in North America
Rugby union competitions in the Caribbean
Women's rugby union in North America
2023 in North American rugby union
2023 in American rugby union
RAN